The 2020–21 Israeli Basketball State Cup will be the 61st edition of the Israeli Basketball State Cup, organized by the Israel Basketball Association.

On 5 August, 2020, the Israel Basketball Association announced that the draw for the tournament would be held on 20 August at 2 p.m. local time. Maccabi Rishon LeZion, Hapoel Jerusalem, Ironi Nes Ziona and Ironi Nahariya automatically advanced to the Round of 16 and did not have to play in the first round.

First round
The first round draw took place on 20 August, 2020.

Round of 16
The Round of 16 draw took place on 10 November, 2020.

Quarterfinals
The draw for the quarter-finals took place on 22 December, 2020.

Final Four
The draw for the semi-finals took place on 7 January, 2021.

Bracket

Semifinals

Final

References

2020
Cup